The 44th Annual Martín Fierro Awards, presented by APTRA, were held on May 18, 2014. During the ceremony, APTRA gave the Martín Fierro Awards for 2013 works.

Nominations
The nominations for the 44th Annual Martín Fierro Awards were announced by Carlos Sciacaluga, president of APTRA, on April 15, 2014. The ceremony will be held at the Hilton Hotel on May 18, and it will be televised by El Trece. The telenovela Farsantes got the highest number of nominations, with 13 nominations, followed by the telenovelas Solamente Vos and Los vecinos en guerra.

The Kirchnerite journalist Víctor Hugo Morales, TV host of Bajada de línea, announced that he would resign from the ceremony. He did so when he began to receive public praise for the nomination. Jorge Rial, who had criticized the nominations at previous years and resigned when nominated, was not nominated for the 44th ceremony.

The newspaper La Nación commented that the nominations may have controversial selections. The nominations for best production and best program for kids mix programs of unrelated styles, making comparisons difficult. The best daily telecomedy includes Mis amigos de siempre, which began airing in 2014, and which already had a genre shift into drama by the time of the nominations.

The documents that certified the nominations were distributed on May 6, at the Hilton hotel. Florencia de la V made her first public appearance since the death of the fashion designer Jorge Ibáñez, close friend of her. The actor Julio Chávez and the producer Sebastián Ortega did not attend the ceremony because of other duties. Nicolás Francella and Peter Lanzani received the documents for their telenovela Aliados, on behalf of the whole cast. Natalia Oreiro, who had just returned from a tour in Russia, arrived to the hotel while the ceremony was still going on.

Ceremony
The 2013 ceremony had politically loaded speeches by the winners. The 2014 ceremony was instead largely devoid of such controversies, and most winners just voiced their gratitude. Jorge Lanata, who starred most of the controversies of the previous year, made just a simple joke: he attended the ceremony with a can of gasoline. He said that he would set himself on fire if 678 received the Martín Fierro.

The telenovela Farsantes won the Golden Martín Fierro Award at the end of the ceremony. The actor Facundo Arana did not attend the ceremony, as he had conflicts with the other actors. Fellow actor Alfredo Casero and producer Adrián Suar praised his work in the telenovela.

Awards

Television
Winners are listed first and highlighted in boldface. Other nominations are listed in alphabetic order.

Radio
Winners are listed first and highlighted in boldface. Other nominations are listed in alphabetic order.

Honorary awards
Arturo Puig is an actor with a long career in the Argentine television. Although many of his programs were awarded in the past, he had never received a personal award. He was nominated as best secondary actor, but lost to Roberto Carnaghi. APTRA gave him an honorary award, acknowledging his career.

References

2013 in Argentine television
2014 in Argentina
2014 television awards
Argentina culture-related lists